The Curve is a 2020 documentary film written, directed, and produced by Adam Benzine. It is about the United States' response to the COVID-19 pandemic. It was released on the internet on October 27, 2020, a week before the United States presidential election.

References

External links

2020 films
2020 documentary films
Documentary films about the COVID-19 pandemic
Films about the Trump presidency
2020s English-language films
Canadian documentary films
2020s American films